The 2006 FIFA Beach Soccer World Cup was the second edition of the FIFA Beach Soccer World Cup, governed by FIFA. Overall, this was the 12th edition of a world cup in beach soccer since the establishment of the Beach Soccer World Championships which ran from 1995–2004 but was not governed by FIFA. It took place in Rio de Janeiro, Brazil, from 2–12 November 2006.

The winners of the tournament were hosts Brazil, who won their first FIFA Beach Soccer World Cup title and their tenth world title overall.

Major changes to format 

After the 2005 World Cup, beach soccer continued to grow and spread worldwide at a fast rate. Therefore, FIFA established the FIFA Beach Soccer World Cup qualifiers, to try to allow more nations to play in the World Cup, as well as getting more national teams involved in the sport. FIFA also increased the number of participating teams in the World Cup from 12 to a record-high 16 teams. This also meant that nations would no longer be invited to play in the World Cup but would have to qualify.

With the establishment of the qualifying rounds, FIFA decided to standardise each World Cup, meaning that from this World Cup onwards, each confederation would have the same number of teams participating in each World Cup and that the 16 teams would be split up into four groups of four teams, with the top two teams moving on to the quarter finals.

Qualifying rounds

African zone 

African nations were allocated 2 berths at the World Cup. The championship took place between September 28 and September 30, 2006. Cameroon and Nigeria were the two finalists, meaning they both qualified for the World Cup. Cameroon defeated Nigeria in the final to win the title.

Asian zone 

Asian nations were allocated 3 berths at the World Cup. The championship took place between May 22 and May 26, 2006. Bahrain and Japan were the two finalists, meaning they both qualified for the World Cup. Bahrain defeated Japan in the final to win the title. Iran and China were knocked out in the semi finals and played each other in the third place play off. Iran beat China to claim the third berth at the World Cup.

European zone 

European nations were allocated 5 berths at the World Cup. Instead of having a specific tournament for World Cup qualification, qualification was achieved through the 2006 Euro Beach Soccer League which took place earlier in the year. The nations who made it to the second stage of the Superfinal qualified to the World Cup being Spain, Portugal, Poland and Italy. To decide who would claim the fifth berth, the defeated nations in the competition came back to play in a straight knockout tournament, with the winner progressing to the World Cup. The nation which won the tournament was France who beat Switzerland in the final.

North, Central American and Caribbean zone 

North, Central American and Caribbean nations were allocated 2 berths at the World Cup. The championship took place between September 13 and September 17, 2006. The United States and Canada were the two finalists, meaning they both qualified for the World Cup. The United States defeated Canada in the final to win the title.

Oceanian zone 

Oceanian nations were allocated 1 berth at the World Cup. The championship took place between August 31 and September 3, 2006. The Solomon Islands and Vanuatu were the two finalists. The Solomon Islands defeated Vanuatu in the final to win the title and qualify for the World Cup.

South American zone 

South American nations were allocated 3 berths at the World Cup. The championship took place between March 5 and March 12, 2006. Brazil and Uruguay were the two finalists, meaning they both qualified for the World Cup. Brazil defeated Uruguay in the final to win the title. Argentina and Venezuela were knocked out in the semi finals and played each other in the third place play off. Argentina beat Venezuela to claim the third berth at the World Cup.

Teams 
These are the teams that qualified for the World Cup:

Asian zone:
  (first appearance)
  (first appearance)
 

African zone:
  (first appearance)
  (first appearance)

European zone:
 
 
  (first appearance)
 
 

North, Central American and Caribbean zone:
 
 

Oceanian zone:
  (first appearance)

South American zone:

Venue 
As with the previous FIFA editions of the World Cup held in Rio, the tournament once again took place at the Copacabana Beach Soccer Arena.

Group stage 
The 16 teams present at the finals in Brazil were split into 4 groups of 4 teams. Each team played the other 3 teams in its group in a round-robin format, with the top two teams advancing to the quarter finals. The quarter finals, semi finals and the final itself was played in the form of a knockout tournament.

All matches are listed as local time in Rio de Janeiro, (UTC-3)

Group A 

 Note: Japan, Poland and the USA were involved in a three-way tie. Therefore, their match results against Brazil were ignored. Each team won one game against another side, so this couldn't break the tie. The next criterion is goal difference. Japan had the best goal difference from its two matches against Poland and USA, and thus were ranked the top of the tie-breaker, taking the group runners-up position.

Group B

Group C

Group D

Knockout stage

Quarter-finals

Semi-finals

Third place play off

Final

Winners

Awards

Top scorers 

21 goals
  Madjer
12 goals
  Benjamin
10 goals
  Bruno
9 goals
  Júnior Negão
8 goals
  Alan
7 goals
  Boguslaw Saganowski
  Didier Samoun
  Jeremy Basquaise
6 goals
  Sipho Sibiya
  Betinho
5 goals
  Amarelle
  James Naka
  Rashed Salem
  Takeshi Kawaharazuka
  Pampero
4 goals
  Raphael Xexeo
  Mohammad Ahmadzadeh
  Roberto Pasquali

4 goals (cont.)
  Santiago Hilaire
  Bueno
  Miguel
  Sidney
  Buru
  Gustavo
3 goals
  Abdulla Omar
  Benyam Astorga
  Ifeanyi Onigbo
  Isiaka Olawale
  Medrano Tamen
  Mario Chimienti
  Katsuhiro Yoshii
  Masahito Toma
  Naoyuki Kuroki
  Belchior
  Fabian
  Laurent Castro
  Marinho
  Sebastien Perez
  Stéphane François
2 goals
  Marek Zuk
  Alfonso
  Bartholomew Ibenegbu
  Brendon Taguinod
  Etienne Ngiladjoe

2 goals (cont.)
  Faroogh Dara
  Gabriel Agu
  Henry Koto
  Omo
  Valery Bithe
  Nico
  Facundo Minici
  Federico Andrade
  Federico Hilaire
  Kyle Yamada
  Kyriakos Selaidopoulos
  Adnan Ebrahim
  Andre
  Coco
  Hernani
  Jairzinho Cardoso
  Jean-Marc Edouard
  Marc Libbra
  Matias
  Noel Sciortino
  Ricar
35 others scored 1 goal each

Final standings

External links 
 FIFA Beach Soccer World Cup Rio de Janeiro 2006 , FIFA.com

 
FIFA Beach Soccer World Cup
FIFA Beach Soccer World Cup
2006
Fifa Beach Soccer World Cup, 2006